Dženan is a masculine Bosnian given name. Notable people with the name include:

Dženan Uščuplić, retired Bosnian footballer
Dzenan Catic, Bosnian footballer
Dženan Zaimović, Bosnian footballer
Dženan Haračić, Bosnian footballer
Dženan Đonlagić, Bosnian economist

Bosnian masculine given names